Anmol Rattan (Rare Jewel) is 1950 Bollywood drama film directed by M. Sadiq. The film was produced by Jaimani Dewan for his Dewan Productions banner, with music composed by Vinod. The film starred Karan Dewan, who was known as a "jubilee star" with most of his films becoming box-office successes. He was the younger brother of producer Jaimani Dewan. Karan's co-stars were Meena Shorey (credited, as she was in all her films, as just Meena), Nirmala, Gope, Madan Puri and Gulab.

The story was written by D. N. Madhok, who also wrote the lyrics and screenplay. Karan Dewan plays an idealistic struggling writer, who is waiting for his book to be published. His love interest was played by Meena.

Cast
Karan Dewan
Meena Shorey (as Meena in credit roll)
Madan Puri
Gope
Gulab
Nirmala

Review
Anmol Rattan'''s review was titled "M. Sadiq's Insipid Direction". The film was called a "worthless picture"  from Jaimini Dewan, "there was nothing anmol about it". The director M. Sadiq, and story writer D. N. Madhok, came in for harsh criticism stating that they had "insulted all cinegoers" by making this film. The photography by Ratanlal Nagar was praised as "the only man who has done his job well", as was actor Gope in his comic role "the only artiste who gave a good performance".

Music
The soundtrack was composed by Vinod, with lyrics by D. N. Madhok. Vinod used Talat Mehmood in Anmol Rattan as Talat's first venture in Hindi films. However, since Arzoo (1950) was released earlier the credit of Talat's first song goes to composer Anil Biswas for the song "Ae Dil Mujhe Aisi Jagah Le Chal". The popularity of that ghazal had Vinod choose Talat for one more film Wafa'' (1950). Playback singers included Talat Mahmood, Lata Mangeshkar, Nirmala and Asha Bhosle.

Songlist

References

External links
 
 

1950 films
1950s Hindi-language films
1950 drama films
Indian drama films
Films scored by Vinod
Hindi-language drama films
Indian black-and-white films
Films directed by M. Sadiq